Sreelekshmi is an Indian actress who appears in Malayalam-language films and television serials. She has won three Kerala state Awards, two Kerala State Television Award for Best Actress and one Kerala State Film Award for Second Best Actress.

Personal life
She was born to Bhaskaran Nair and Rajeswariyamma, as the youngest child among three children at Vazhuthacaud, Thiruvananthapuram, Kerala. She has two elder brothers, Krishnakumar and Vjay Bhaskar. She had her primary education at Carmel Girls Higher Secondary School, Trivandrum. She was the Kalathilakam in 1991 at Kerala university. After her pre-university course she pursued a diploma in Bharata Natyam dance from Kalakshetra, Chennai.

She is married to Ratheesh, General Manager in an interior fit out company based in Dubai. They have two sons, Ananth Maheshwar and Akshith Maheshwar. After marriage she retired from movies and settled at Dubai with family. While in Dubai the actress was busy running a dance school. She made a comeback in 2012 with television serials. Currently she resides at Thiruvananthapuram and runs a dance school Temple of Arts at muttada road marappalam,Pattom Trivandrum.

Awards

 1991 - Kerala University Kalathilakam
 1997 - Kerala State Film Award for Second Best Actress - Bhoothakkannadi
 1997 - Kerala State Television Award for Best Actress - Maranam Durbalam (Doordharsan)
 2011 - Kerala State Television Award for Best Actress - Ardhachandrante Rathri (Amritha TV)

Filmography

Films

Television Serials

 Other TV Shows
 Surya Challenge 
 Beat the Floors
 Parayam Nedam
 Red Carpet
 Zee Keralam Mahotsavam
 Onnum Onnum Moonu
 Varthaprabhatham
 Tharapakittu
 Dream Drive
 Comedy Super Nite
 Ladies Hour

Miscellaneous
She has participated in popular game show SURYA CHALLENGE on Surya TV along with Avalude Kadha team. She has acted in some advertisements also. She judged the reality show Beat the floors in DD Malayalam.She has performed in amateur dramas like Nareeyam.

References

External links

Sreelakshmi at MSI
http://www.metromatinee.com/artist/Sreelakshmi%20Sreekumar-5759 

Actresses in Malayalam cinema
Indian film actresses
Actresses from Thiruvananthapuram
Living people
Indian television actresses
Actresses in Malayalam television
20th-century Indian actresses
21st-century Indian actresses
Kerala State Television Award winners
1995 births